Mundoni (also Romanized as Mūndonī, Mowndanī, and Mūndanī; also known as Māndanī, Mīmdani, and Mondonī) is a village in Aghili-ye Jonubi Rural District, Aghili District, Gotvand County, Khuzestan Province, Iran. At the 2006 census, its population was 584, in 127 families.

References 

Populated places in Gotvand County